The two ukiyo-e woodblock prints making up View of Tempōzan Park in Naniwa are half of a tetraptych by Osaka artist Gochōtei Sadamasu (fl. c. 1832–52). They depict a scene of crowds visiting Mount Tempō in springtime to admire its natural beauty. The sheets belong to the permanent collection of the Royal Ontario Museum, Canada.

Print details 

 Medium:  woodblock print; ink and colour on paper
 Size: chūban
 Format: tate-e, sheets 1 and 2 of tetraptych
 Genre: fūkeiga 
 Japanese title: 
 Exhibit title: View of Tempōzan Park in Naniwa
 Inscription: none
 Signature:  in　rectangular cartouche 
 Publisher's mark: 天喜 (Tenki)
 Publisher's seal: 天 (Tenki) 
 Censor seal: none
 Date seal: none
 Credit line: none

Artist 
 (n.d.) was a prominent Osaka-based producer of ukiyo-e prints during the first half of the nineteenth century. Not much is known about his personal details, but he is known to have studied with Utagawa Kunisada in Edo. He was not a professional artist, but instead a moneyed landowner who used his wealth to support other Osaka print-makers directly and by opening a school of print design.

Publisher 
Both panels bear publisher's marks associated with Tenki. The seal is a stylized version of the character 天 (ten) contained within a circle. Ukiyo-e scholar Andreas Marks notes that the seal version appearing in View of Tempōzan Park in Naniwa was used by Tenki on prints from 1826 to 1838.

Medium 
This term was used to distinguish prints produced in Kyoto and Osaka— a region then known as Kamigata— from those originating in Edo. Having come to prominence approximately a century after the emergence of ukiyo-e in Edo, the kamigata-e genre was predominantly devoted to kabuki-e, images of kabuki actors on and off stage. Another differentiating characteristic of kamigata-e is the fact that they were produced in the main not by professional studio artists, but by amateur “talented kabuki fans” seeking to memorialize and promote their dramatic heroes.

Genre 
The red rectangular cartouche occupying the upper right corner of the first panel reads: Naniwa/ Tempōzan fūkei. This title clearly identifies the tetraptych series as belonging to the landscape genre of ukiyo-e prints, known as fūkeiga.   
In the early years of ukiyo-e, landscapes were not a popular subject, being a “far less dominant” genre than images of actors, beauties or everyday life scenes. In early prints, landscape was “a prop” or backdrop to the human content of the picture. As art historian Tadashi Kobayashi notes, “Landscape ukiyo-e prints by their very nature usually reflect the artist’s conception of natural settings as a stage upon which human scenes are enacted.” This is evident in these two prints by Sadamasu, where the landscape provides the impetus and scene for the human action dominating the image.

By the end of the first half of the nineteenth century, landscapes had “eclipsed” bijinga, shunga and kabuki-e as the major strain of ukiyo-e. Partly as a result of the increasing influence of western art, landscape became a pictorial theme in and of itself, such that Hiroshige had established himself by the mid-1830s as a producer of landscape prints.

Format 
The prints are vertical tate-e sheet-prints, and comprise the first and second panels of a tetraptych. As Japanese prints of the Edo period were read from right to left, they represent the two right-hand panels of the four-panel set. They are numbered with the kanji characters 一 (1) and 貳 (2) in black ink within yellow squares at the top of the left-side column of the rectangular seal and signature cartouches.

Size 
Each of the two sheets is cut to the  size, which typically measures approximately 39 cm by 27 cm. This was the most prevalent format for colour ukiyo-e prints after 1780, particularly among Edo print-makers. This size was supplanted in kamigata-e by the smaller  format—approximately 18 cm by 25 cm—from 1847 on, due in large part to Sadamasu's promotion of the smaller size among local artists.

Subject 
The prints depict a scene of crowds visiting Tempōzan Park in Naniwa, the former name for present-day Osaka. Tempōzan—literally Tempō (era) mountain—was an approximately 20-meter high man-made hill created in 1831 (year 2 of the Tempō era) through the dredging of the adjacent Ajigawa River.  It was intended to improve ship access to the port and help prevent flooding. The mound also served as a marker for ships, earning it the nickname "Landmark Mountain"  among local sailors.

After pine and cherry trees were planted on its slopes, Tempōzan drew increasing numbers of visitors, particularly in spring when it was customary to participate in  cherry blossom viewing. As it developed into a popular leisure spot,  tea houses and cafes sprang up to service the crowds.
Sadamasu's print offers a panoramic view of Tempōzan crowded with visitors partaking in o-hanami. The mountain is encircled by a stone wall and bounded on the other side by the bay and port. The scene is lively, packed with figures whom Sadamasu depicts in considerable detail. Those depicted fall into various social ranks and classes including courtesans and geisha, samurai, servants, hawkers and chōnin townspeople. It provides a graphic example of what Calza describes as "the life and social whirl" of the Edo period.

Other copies 

 A copy of Sadamasu's complete Tempōzan tetraptych is preserved in the collection of the Osaka Prefectural Archives.
 Another version of the tetraptych on permanent view is a large-scale tiled mural copy of the complete work within the grounds of Tempōzan Park in Osaka.

Other works related to Tempōzan 

 Moonlit Night at Suehiro Bridge [天保山末廣橋月夜] (1830s) from the series Famous Places of Naniwa (Osaka), Views of Tempōzan at a Glance [浪花名所天保山景勝一覧] by Yashima Gakutei
 Tempōzan at the Mouth of the Aji River in Settsu Province [摂州阿治川口天保山] (1827–30) from the series Remarkable Views of Bridges in Various Provinces [諸国名橋奇覧] by Katsushika Hokusai
 Osaka Tempōzan [大坂天保山] (1859) from the series One Hundred Views of Famous Places in the Provinces [諸国名所百景] by Utagawa Hiroshige II
 Storm in Tempōzan Harbour [大阪天保山夕立の景] (1834) from the series Fine Views of Tempōzan in Osaka [天保山勝景一覧] by Yashima Gakutei

See also 

 Utagawa Kunimasu
 Mount Tenpō
 Bust portrait of Actor Kataoka Ichizō I (Gochōtei Sadamasu II) - print in same gallery
 Female Ghost (Kunisada) - print in same gallery
 Unit 88-9 (Kiyomizu Masahiro) - sculpture in same gallery
 Fan print with two bugaku dancers (Kunisada) - print in same collection
 Ichikawa Omezō as a Pilgrim and Ichikawa Yaozō as a Samurai (Toyokuni I) - print in same gallery
 Eijudō Hibino at Seventy-one (Toyokuni I) - print in same collection
 Spring and autumn landscapes (Hara Zaishō) - scroll painting in same gallery
 Actor Arashi Rikan II as Osome (Ryūsai Shigeharu) - print in same collection
 Ryūsai Shigeharu - professional kamigata-e artist
 Two Actors in Samurai Roles (Gosotei Hirosada) - print in same collection

Notes

References 

 The British Museum. "Osaka Tenpozan yudachi no kei (View of a Sudden Storm over Mt. Tenpo in Osaka) / Osaka hakkei." Trustees of the British Museum. Accessed January 20, 2014. https://www.britishmuseum.org/research/collection_online/collection_object_details.aspx?objectId=784237&partId=1
 Calza, Gian Carlo. Ukiyo-e. New York: Phaidon Press, 2005.
 City of Osaka. "Interesting spots in Minato Ward: Tempozan." Accessed January 20, 2014. http://www.city.osaka.lg.jp/contents/wdu020/minato/english/about/spot_a.html
 Doesburg, Jan van. "Sadamasu." Huys den Esch Gallery. 2012. Accessed November 29, 2013. http://www.huysdenesch.com/ENG/sadamasu/sadumasu-career
 JAANUS. "Ooban." Japanese Architecture and Art Net Users System. Accessed January 16, 2014. http://www.aisf.or.jp/~jaanus/
 JAANUS. "Kamigata-e." Japanese Architecture and Art Net Users System. Accessed January 16, 2014. http://www.aisf.or.jp/~jaanus/
 Japan 365 Days. "Tempozan Park." Japan365days.com. Accessed January 17, 2014. http://www.japan365days.com/osaka_tempozan_park.php
 Kawamoto, Masayuki. "Japan's Lowest Mountain: Tempōzan [日本一低い山:天保山]." 建設の施工企画 705 (2008): 90. Accessed January 20, 2014. http://jcma.heteml.jp/bunken-search/wp-content/uploads/2008/11/090.pdf
 Keyes, Roger S. and Keiko Mizushima. The Theatrical World of Osaka Prints. Boston: Philadelphia Museum of Art, 1973.
 Kitagawa, Hiroko. "Kamigata-e: The Prints of Osaka and Kyoto." In The Hotei Encyclopedia of Japanese Woodblock Prints, vol. 1. Edited by Amy Reigle Newland, 229-232. Amsterdam: Hotei Publishing, 2005.
 Kobayashi, Tadashi. Ukiyo-e: An Introduction to Japanese Woodblock Prints. Translated by Mark A. Harbison. New York: Kodansha, 1992.
 Newland, Amy Reigle. The Hotei Encyclopedia of Japanese Woodblock Prints, vol. 2. Amsterdam: Hotei Publishing, 2005.
 Osaka Archives.「電子博物館展示室　錦絵・日本画 （Denshi hakubutsukan tenjishitsu nishiki-e/ Nihonga）」. Osaka Archives. 2013. Accessed January 17, 2014. http://www.osaka-archives.com/museum_cat_01.html
 Roberts, Laurance P. A Dictionary of Japanese Artists: Painting, Sculpture, Ceramics, Prints, Lacquer. Weatherhill: New York, 1990.
 Vegder, Jerry. "Ukiyo-e Prints: Publishers N-Z." PrintsofJapan.com. Accessed January 17, 2014. https://web.archive.org/web/20130731110827/http://www.printsofjapan.com/Publishers_N_to_Z.htm
 Yonemura, Ann. Masterful Illusions: Japanese Prints in the Anne van Biema Collection. Washington, D.C.: Smithsonian Institution, 2002.

1830s prints
Collections of the Royal Ontario Museum
Ukiyo-e works